James Findlay (15 June 1954 – 19 May 2015) was an Australian swimmer. He competed in two events at the 1972 Summer Olympics.

References

External links
 

1954 births
2015 deaths
Australian male butterfly swimmers
Australian male medley swimmers
Olympic swimmers of Australia
Swimmers at the 1972 Summer Olympics
Commonwealth Games medallists in swimming
Commonwealth Games silver medallists for Australia
Commonwealth Games bronze medallists for Australia
Swimmers at the 1970 British Commonwealth Games
Place of birth missing
20th-century Australian people
21st-century Australian people
Medallists at the 1970 British Commonwealth Games